The International University SDI München (German: Internationale Hochschule SDI München) is a private, officially recognized and approved institute of education in Munich, Germany. It is part of the Sprachen & Dolmetscher Institut München (Munich Institute of Language and Interpretation). It is not considered as a university (Universität) but as a university of applied sciences (Fachhochschule).

History 

The Fachhochschule was founded in 2006 and began its teaching activity in the winter term of 2007/2008.

Sources 

Universities in Germany
Private universities and colleges in Germany
Education in Munich
Educational institutions established in 2006
2006 establishments in Germany